Nidularium amazonicum is a species of flowering plant in the Bromeliaceae family. It is endemic to Brazil.

Cultivars
Nidularium 'Cherry Road'

References

BSI Cultivar Registry Retrieved 11 October 2009

amazonicum
Flora of Brazil
Taxa named by John Gilbert Baker
Taxa named by Jean Jules Linden
Taxa named by Charles Jacques Édouard Morren
Taxa named by Carl Axel Magnus Lindman